The Soyuz-2.1v (Union 2.1v), GRAU index 14A15, known earlier in development as the Soyuz-1  (Union 1), is a Russian expendable launch vehicle. It was derived from the Soyuz-2.1b, and is a member of the R-7 family of rockets. It is built by TsSKB Progress, at Samara in Russia. Launches are conducted from existing facilities at the Plesetsk Cosmodrome in Northwest Russia, with pads also available at the Baikonur Cosmodrome in Kazakhstan, and new facilities at the Vostochny Cosmodrome in Eastern Russia.

Vehicle 

The Soyuz-2.1v represents a major departure from earlier Soyuz rockets. Unlike the Soyuz-2.1b upon which it is based, it does away with the four boosters used on all other R-7 vehicles. The first stage of the Soyuz-2.1v is a heavily modified derivative of the Soyuz-2 second stage, with a single-chamber NK-33 engine replacing the four-chamber RD-107 used on previous rockets along with structural modifications to the stage and lower tanking. Since the NK-33 is fixed, the RD-0110R engine is used to supply thrust vector control. It also supplies an extra  of thrust and heats the pressurization gases.

The NK-33 engine, originally built for the N1 programme, offers increased performance over the RD-107; however, only a limited number of engines are available. Once the supply is exhausted, the NK-33 will be replaced by the RD-193. In April 2013, it was announced that the RD-193 engine had completed testing. The RD-193 is a lighter and shorter engine based on the Angara's RD-191, which is itself a derivative of the Zenit's RD-170.

The second stage of the Soyuz-2.1v is the same as the third stage  of the Soyuz-2.1b; powered by an RD-0124 engine. For most missions a Volga upper stage will be used to manoeuvre the payload from an initial parking orbit to its final destination. The Volga is derived from the propulsion system of the Yantar reconnaissance satellite, and was developed as a lighter and cheaper alternative to the Fregat.

List of launches

Photogallery from Paris Air Show 2011 

Russia exhibited a model of the Soyuz-2.1v during the 2011 Paris Air Show at Le Bourget.

See also 

 List of R-7 launches

References 

R-7 (rocket family)
Space launch vehicles of Russia
2013 in spaceflight
Vehicles introduced in 2013